The 1976 U.S. Pro Tennis Championships was a men's tennis tournament played on outdoor green clay courts (Har-Tru) at the Longwood Cricket Club in Chestnut Hill, Massachusetts in the United States. It was classified as a 4 Star category tournament and was part of the 1976 Grand Prix circuit. It was the 49th edition of the tournament and was held from August 23 through August 30, 1976. Second-seeded, and defending champion of the previous two editions, Björn Borg won the singles title and the accompanying $25,000 first-prize money as well as a 100 Grand Prix ranking points.

Finals

Singles
 Björn Borg defeated  Harold Solomon 6–7, 6–4, 6–1, 6–2
 It was Borg's 6th singles title of the year and the 19th of his career.

Doubles
 Ray Ruffels /  Allan Stone defeated  Mike Cahill /  John Whitlinger 3–6, 6–3, 7–6

References

External links
 ITF tournament edition details
 Longwood Cricket Club – list of U.S. Pro Champions

U.S. Pro Tennis Championships
U.S. Pro Championships
U.S. Pro Tennis Championships
U.S. Pro Tennis Championships
Chestnut Hill, Massachusetts
Clay court tennis tournaments
History of Middlesex County, Massachusetts
Sports in Middlesex County, Massachusetts
Tennis tournaments in Massachusetts
Tourist attractions in Middlesex County, Massachusetts